David Bellego (born 15 May 1993 in Marmande) is a French motorcycle speedway rider, who competes in Grasstrack, Longtrack and Speedway. He is four times champion of France.

Speedway career

International
In 2012, he was part of the French team that won the bronze medal at the 2012 Team Long Track World Championship. Six years later he became a world champion after scoring 12 points as part of the winning team for 2018 Team Long Track World Championship. The following year he helped France successfully defend the 2019 Team Long Track World Championship. He also participated in the Individual Speedway European Championship four times in 2019, 2020, 2021 and 2022.

In 2022, he won his fourth French Individual Speedway Championship.

Club
In 2012, he was part of the Berwick Bandits side that won the Premier League Four-Team Championship. In 2016, he rode for Redcar Bears and in 2017, Bellego competed full-time in the top division of British Speedway for the first time with Swindon Robins when they won the League Championship and was retained for the 2018 season. David won the Swedish league with Masarna in 2020. 

In 2023, he signed for Sheffield Tigers for the SGB Premiership 2023, having previously ridden for them in 2015.

Major results

World Team Championships
2018 Speedway of Nations - =10th
2019 Speedway of Nations - =8th 
2021 Speedway of Nations - 5th
2022 Speedway of Nations - 8th

World Individual Longtrack Championship
 2011 18th, 23pts

World Longtrack Team Championship
 2012  St. Macaire (Third) 3/42pts (Rode with Mathieu Trésarrieu, Gabrial Dubernard, Stéphane Trésarrieu)
 2018  Morizes (Champion) 12/54pts (rode with Mathieu Trésarrieu, Dimitri Bergé, Stéphane Trésarrieu)
 2019  Vechta (Champion) 15/64pts (rode with Mathieu Trésarrieu, Dimitri Bergé

References

1993 births
Living people
French speedway riders
French motorcycle racers
Berwick Bandits riders
Redcar Bears riders
Sheffield Tigers riders
Swindon Robins riders
Individual Speedway Long Track World Championship riders
People from Marmande
Sportspeople from Lot-et-Garonne